Bassa is a small village situated in Chamba district, Himachal Pradesh, India. Village  population is around 80. Ravi River flows front of this village.

References

Villages in Chamba district